Harold (Hesh) Troper (born January 1, 1942) is a Canadian writer, historian and academic. He specializes in Jewish Canadian history. Together with Irving Abella, he authored None Is Too Many, the story of the Canadian government's refusal to allow Jewish immigration from Europe during the Holocaust. This book was selected as one of the 100 most important Canadian books ever written, chosen by a panel of experts for the Literary Review of Canada.

Troper is the author of several other books, including, The Ransomed of God: The Secret Rescue of the Jews of Syria and Old wounds : Jews, Ukrainians and the hunt for Nazi war criminals in Canada. He is a professor of education at University of Toronto in Toronto, Ontario. Current research interests include Canadian social history, immigration, education of ethnic and minority groups, American history, and the history of education.

References

1942 births
Living people
Jewish Canadian writers
Writers from Ontario
Academic staff of the University of Toronto
20th-century Canadian historians
Canadian male non-fiction writers
21st-century Canadian historians